Aldrovani Menon (born 30 July 1972), known as Aldro, is a former retired Brazilian football player.

Career
He joined Japanese J1 League club Yokohama Flügels in 1993. He played many matches as forward in 1993 season. However he could not play many matches in 1994 and left the club end of 1994 season. In 1995, he moved to Japan Football League club NEC Yamagata. He played for Yamagata until 1997.

Club statistics

Honours 
Yokohama Flügels
 J1 League: 1993
 Emperor's Cup: 1993

Paraná
 Campeonato Paranaense: 1995

Figueirense
 Campeonato Catarinense: 1999

Santa Helena
 Campeonato Goiano Série B: 2006

Rio Verde
 Campeonato Goiano Série B: 2009

References

External links

 
 

1972 births
Living people
Brazilian footballers
Brazilian expatriate footballers
Expatriate footballers in Japan
Campeonato Brasileiro Série A players
Campeonato Brasileiro Série B players
Campeonato Brasileiro Série C players
J1 League players
Sportspeople from Paraná (state)
Sociedade Esportiva Matsubara players
Yokohama Flügels players
Montedio Yamagata players
Ceará Sporting Club players
Ponta Grossa Esporte Clube players
Clube Atlético Juventus players
Figueirense FC players
Esporte Clube Bahia players
Sport Club do Recife players
Esporte Clube Juventude players
Paulista Futebol Clube players
Caxias Futebol Clube players
Grêmio Esportivo Glória players
Vila Nova Futebol Clube players
Paysandu Sport Club players
Goiás Esporte Clube players
Clube Náutico Capibaribe players
Clube 15 de Novembro players
Sociedade Esportiva e Recreativa Caxias do Sul players
Itumbiara Esporte Clube players
Sertãozinho Futebol Clube players
Santa Helena Esporte Clube players
Clube Atlético Metropolitano players
Gurupi Esporte Clube players
Esporte Clube Rio Verde players
Association football forwards